Godan Express numbered as 11055/11056 is a 4 Days a Week Express Train of the Indian Railways, running between Lokmanya Tilak Terminus, Mumbai, the capital city of Maharashtra and Gorakhpur Junction, the prominent city of Uttar Pradesh.Godan Express was inaugurated in the year 2001 (23 December).Godan Express shares its rake with Chhapra Express. It received LHB coaches on 25 May 2019 that was being first LHB run.

Coach composition
The train consists of a total number of 22 Coaches as follows:
 1 AC II Tier
 5 AC III Tier
 1 Economy AC III Tier
 10 Sleeper Class
 3 Unreserved
 1 Passenger cum Luggage van
 1 Eog

Locomotive

 WAP 7 of KYN/AQ/ET:Lokmanya Tilak Terminus - Gorakhpur Junction

Godan express undergoes Loco Reversal at Prayagraj Junction

Average speed
 11055DN- 54 km/h
 11056UP- 55 km/h

RSA - Rake Sharing Arrangement
This Train shares Rake with 11059/11060 Chhapra Express

See also
 Chhapra Express

References

External links 
 गोदान एक्स्प्रेस/1056
 मुंबई गोरखपुर गोदान एक्स्प्रेस/1055

Passenger trains originating from Gorakhpur
Named passenger trains of India
Rail transport in Maharashtra
Rail transport in Madhya Pradesh
Transport in Mumbai
Express trains in India